James Stevens (May 9, 1836 in Rome, Oneida County, New York – June 14, 1912) was an American politician from New York.

Life
He was the son of Samuel B. Stevens (1805–1884) and Elizabeth (Tibbits) Stevens (1810–1896). He engaged in the forwarding business.

He was President of the Village of Rome from 1867 to 1868; a member of the New York State Assembly (Oneida Co., 3rd D.) in 1868 and 1869; a member of the New York State Senate (22nd D.) in 1880 and 1881; and Mayor of Rome from 1887 to 1891.

He died on June 14, 1912, and was buried at the Rome Cemetery.

Sources
 Civil List and Constitutional History of the Colony and State of New York compiled by Edgar Albert Werner (1884; pg. 291 and 370)
 Life Sketches of the State Officers, Senators, and Members of the Assembly of the State of New York in 1868 by S. R. Harlow & S. C. Hutchins (pg. 359)
 Oneida County history
 List of Mayors at Rome NY official website
 Rome Cemetery transcriptions

1836 births
1912 deaths
Democratic Party New York (state) state senators
Politicians from Rome, New York
Mayors of places in New York (state)
Democratic Party members of the New York State Assembly
19th-century American politicians